The Euxine–Colchic deciduous forests is a temperate broadleaf and mixed forests ecoregion located along the southern shore of the Black Sea. The ecoregion extends along the thin coastal strip from the southeastern corner of Bulgaria in the west, across the northern coast of Turkey, to Georgia in the east, where it wraps around the eastern end of the Black Sea.

Sub-regions
The ecoregion is divided into two sub-regions, chiefly based on the amount of precipitation.

The understory of evergreen mesomorphic broadleaf shrubs is characteristic for both sub-regions. Notable species in the understory include various rhododendrons such as Pontic rhododendron (Rhododendron ponticum); Black Sea holly (Ilex colchica), cherry laurel (Laurocerasus officinalis), Caucasus (Buxus colchica) and common box (Buxus sempervirens), Caucasian whortleberry (Vaccinium arctostaphylos), etc. From a European perspective, the majority of these count as relict species from the Tertiary period.

Colchian forests
The Colchic or Colchian forests are found around the southeast corner of the Black Sea in Turkey and Georgia in and around the Machakhela National Park. The Colchian forests are mixed, with deciduous black alder (Alnus glutinosa), hornbeam (Carpinus betulus and C. orientalis), Oriental beech (Fagus orientalis), and sweet chestnut (Castanea sativa), together with evergreen Nordmann fir (Abies nordmanniana, the tallest tree in Europe at ), Caucasian spruce (Picea orientalis) and Scots pine (Pinus sylvestris). The Colchic region has high rainfall, averaging  annually, with a maximum in excess of 400 cm, and is home to some of Europe's temperate rainforests.

Euxinic forests
The drier Euxine or Euxinic forests lie west of the Melet River, which meets the Black Sea in the city of Ordu, and extend across the Bosporus along the Black Sea coast of European Turkey to Bulgaria. The Euxine forests receive an average of 100 to 150 cm precipitation annually. The Bulgarian part of the ecoregion lies within Strandzha Nature Park, where it borders on and transitions into the Balkan mixed forests ecoregion.

Rare habitat types include coastal sand dunes and peatlands.

Pine processionary moth is one of the threats.

Fauna
Large mammals native to the ecoregion include brown bear (Ursus arctos), Caucasian red deer (Cervus elaphus maral), roe deer (Capreolus capreolus), lynx (Lynx lynx), and golden jackal (Canis aureus).

The ecoregion is habitat for many migrating, wintering, and breeding birds. It is on a bird migratory pathway known the East Black Sea Migration Route, which connects Scandinavia and Western Russia to the Mediterranean Sea and Africa. Water birds found in the ecoregion include the eastern imperial eagle (Aquila heliaca), Dalmatian pelican (Pelecanus crispus), great white pelican (Pelecanus onocrotalus), pygmy cormorant (Microcarbo pygmaeus), white-headed duck (Oxyura leucocephala), ferruginous duck (Aythya nyroca), red-crested pochard (Netta rufina), black stork (Ciconia nigra), white stork (C. ciconia), common crane (Grus grus), demoiselle crane (Grus virgo), greater flamingo (Phoenicopterus roseus), and Bewick's swan (Cygnus bewickii).

Protected areas
A 2017 assessment found that , or 1%, of the ecoregion is in protected areas. Protected areas include the Strandzha Nature Park in Bulgaria and the Machakhela National Park, Mtirala National Park, and the Kintrishi Protected Landscape in Georgia. In 2021, the Georgian protected areas were inscribed on the UNESCO World Heritage List as part of the Colchic Rainforests and Wetlands site, because of the biodiversity and distinctiveness of the Colchic forests.

External links

References 

Ecoregions of Asia
Ecoregions of Europe
Ecoregions of Bulgaria
Ecoregions of Georgia (country)
Ecoregions of Turkey

Biota of Bulgaria
Biota of Georgia (country)
Biota of Turkey
 
Black Sea
Black Sea Region
Marmara Region
Strandzha
Palearctic ecoregions
Temperate broadleaf and mixed forests
Natural history of Anatolia